The 1971 World Cup took place November 11–14 at PGA National Golf Club (now BallenIsles Country Club, East Course) in Palm Beach Gardens, Florida. It was the 19th World Cup event. The tournament was a 72-hole stroke play team event with 46 teams, which was a record high number of participants. Each team consisted of two players from a country. The combined score of each team determined the team results. The United States team of Jack Nicklaus and Lee Trevino won by eight strokes over the South Africa team of Harold Henning and Gary Player. The individual competition was won by Nicklaus seven strokes ahead of Player. This was the 11th team victory for the United States in the history of the World Cup, founded in 1953 and until 1967 named the Canada Cup.

Teams 

(a) denotes amateur

Scores 
Team

The Singapore team was disqualified when Phua Thin Kiay could not play the first round due to tonsillitis. He played the remaining rounds and his teammate, Alvin Liau played all four rounds.

International Trophy

Sources:

References 

World Cup (men's golf)
Golf in Florida
World Cup
World Cup golf